Lokomotiv Baku is an Azerbaijani women's volleyball club.

History

Team
Season 2015–2016
As of December 2015.

Honours
Challenge Cup
 Winner: 2011/2012
 Runners-up: 2010/2011
  Azerbaijan Superleague:
  Runners-up (4): 2002-03, 2009–10, 2011–12, 2014-15
  Third (4): 2003-04, 2004–05, 2007–08, 2008-09

References

External links

Volleyball in Azerbaijan

Azerbaijani volleyball clubs
Sports teams in Baku
Railway sports teams
2008 establishments in Azerbaijan
Volleyball clubs established in 2008